Émile Auguste Ouchard (24 July 1900–14 February 1969) was a French bow maker of repute and son and pupil of Émile François Ouchard. Honors & awards include the Grand Prix of the 1942 International Paris Exhibition.

Biography
He was born in 1900 in Mirecourt (Vosges). After his apprenticeship E.A. Ouchard worked for a few years with his father at rue Canon in Mirecourt. Later worked in Paris and  the United States, returning to France in the mid 1950s. 
To be more exact, in 1940 A. Ouchard started  his own workshop at rue de Rome in Paris before leaving for the United States in 1946.
He  first joined RUDIE in New York and then LEWIS & Sons in Chicago. His bows are similar to those of the Voirin-Lamy school. 
A master craftsman and artist who made bows with perfect symmetry and with the perfect balance of suppleness and resistance for effortless staccato and cantabile sound. He died in Gan in 1969.
Collaborators & successors include Bernard Ouchard (b. 1925) (son) and Jean Claude Ouchard  (b. 1935) (son).

Awards
Honors & awards include Grand Prix at the 1942 International Paris Exhibition.

Stamps include : 
Emile OUCHARD»  (first period)
«E.A. OUCHARD FILS» 
«E.A. OUCHARD PARIS» 
«E.A. OUCHARD»

Quotes
"His son, Bernard, ( b.1925 ) became his pupil, and worked with Vidoudez in Geneva before being appointed professor of bow making at the Mirecourt school in 1971, giving rise to the New French School which has produced such luminaries as  Benoit Rolland, Jean-François Raffin and Stéphane Thomachot. Most notable of the younger generation include Edwin Clément, Sylvain Bigot, Gilles Nehr  and Yannick LeCanu." - Gennady Filimonov 

"As playing tools, bows by Emile A. Ouchard are similar to those by Sartory in that they are designed to accommodate the player’s need for weight and strength in a bow. Some in the trade have maintained that bows by E.A. Ouchard are often actually superior in craftsmanship to those by Sartory. There is merit to this argument, but in general Ouchard bows go further in the direction of strength and weight than Sartory bows, and they require even more cushioning intervention to produce the optimal tone quality." - Stefan Hersh

References

 
 
 
 Dictionnaire Universel des Luthiers - Rene Vannes 1951,1972, 1985 (vol.3)
 Universal Dictionary of Violin & Bow Makers - William Henley 1970
 Article: The Ouchard dynasty of bow makers

1900 births
1969 deaths
Luthiers from Mirecourt
Bow makers